The Taekwondo  event at the 2022 Mediterranean Games was held in Oran, Algeria, from 3 to 4 July 2022.

Medal table

Medal summary

Men's events

Women's events

References

External links
Official site
Results book

Sports at the 2022 Mediterranean Games
2022
Mediterranean Games